Pohorská Ves is a municipality and village in Český Krumlov District in the South Bohemian Region of the Czech Republic. It has about 200 inhabitants.

Administrative parts
Hamlets of Janova Ves, Lužnice and Pohoří na Šumavě are administrative parts of Pohorská Ves.

References

Villages in Český Krumlov District